is a mecha anime series that aired from 1982 to 1983 in Japan. There were 39 episodes released. Other loosely translated names include Baxinger, Galaxy Gale Baxingar, Galactic Stormwind Baxingar and Cosmo Rangers. In addition, it was known as "Mustanger" while sold as a knock-off toy in the United States during the early 80's.  It is the second entry of the J9 Series, serving as a sequel to Galaxy Cyclone Braiger and followed by Galactic Whirlwind Sasuraiger. Its plot was based on the Japanese late Tokugawa period and the story of the Shinsengumi samurai.

Original story
The story is set 600 years after the destruction of Jupiter where the Solar System was in a state of peace under the Bakufu government. However, the lawlessness of this new Solar System prompts a man named Dan Condor to organize a new J9 team to fight against injustice. Equipped with Cosmobikes, they merge into a super robot named Baxingar.

Concept
The main robot, Baxingar, is assembled from five motorbikes and stands at 48 meters tall.

Cast
Director: Takao Yotsuji

Additional Directors: Jouhei Matsuura, Hideki Takayama

Character Design: Kazuo Komatsubara

Mecha Design: Hiroshi Ohnishi

Characters

Video games
Baxingar has been featured in the video game Super Robot Wars GC alongside the other titular robots Braiger and Sasuraiger. The only enemy units from the series to appear in the game are the Shin Wakusei Rengu Battleship and the Krauwanka.

External links
 

1982 anime television series debuts
Adventure anime and manga
Discotek Media
Super robot anime and manga